The 1996 Gloucester City Council election took place on 5 May 1996 to elect members of Gloucester City Council in England.

Results

|}

Ward results

Barnwood

Barton

Eastgate

Hucclecote

Kingsholm

Linden

Longlevens

Matson

Podsmead

Tuffley

Westgate

References

1996 English local elections
1996
1990s in Gloucestershire